Line 1 of the Guangzhou Metro runs from  to . The first section, from Xilang to Huangsha, opened on 28 June 1997, making Guangzhou the fourth city in mainland China to have a metro system. Construction took a total of 66 months. The total investment is 12.2616 billion yuan with an average cost per kilometer of 662.9 million yuan. The full line started operation on 28 June 1999. Line 1 is coloured yellow.

Line 1 connects the old city on the north bank of the Pearl River and new development areas west of Tianhe District passing through many dense areas and important landmarks in central Guangzhou. At the same time, it also connects the newly built Guangzhou East Railway Station and Fangcun Passenger Station, two major transportation hubs. After the opening of the first section of the Guangfo Metro, it became a key corridor for traffic between the central urban areas of Guangzhou and neighboring Foshan. Therefore, after the opening of the whole line, Line 1 has become an important east–west artery in the urban area of ​​Guangzhou.

Although Line 1 has largely not been expanded since 1999, the passenger flows of Line 1 has been increasing as the Guangzhou Metro network continues to rapidly expand its coverage in and around Guangzhou. At present, the average daily passenger flow has exceeded one million passengers per day, ranking among highest of Guangzhou Metro's lines. Trains are often crowded during the morning and evening peak hours, and the platforms of key transfer stations (Gongyuanqian, Tiyu West Road etc.) are even more crowded. Line 1 remains busy throughout the day leading to it being the subway line with the highest passenger intensity in Mainland China with 55,000 passengers/day/km in 2019.

Upgrades 
In 2004, station ventilation and electrical systems started to be updated and platforms strengthened in preparation for retrofitting of platform screen doors in all stations, one of the first PSD retrofit projects in Mainland China. By 2009, all stations on Line 1 where fitted with PSDs.Since Line 1 was put into operation, there have been several incidents of service disruptions due to overhead catenary cable breakages. During that period, Guangzhou Metro experimented rigid catenary installations between Kengkou and Huadiwan stations. Rigid catenary was promoted on all newer lines using overhead electric traction such as Line 2. Since 2007, Guangzhou Metro began converting Line 1's overhead into rigid catenary without shutting down regular service. Instead trains run at a speed limit of  when passing through the temporary transition sections.

In 2011, Line 1 carried out renovation work on the walls of the entire station, removing the original wall tiles and replacing them with gray tiles. Chen Yihua, a middle school student from Guangzhou No. 16 Middle School attracted media attention by opening protesting the rational of the renovation, arguing the new uniform tiles destroy the unique decoration and design features of each Line 1 station. In the end, the project was suspended with only some stations renovated. The rest of the stations remained as is temporarily. In 2017, the platform of Line 1 of Guangzhou East Railway Station began to have its wall tiles and false ceiling decorations replaced. However, the replaced tiles and decorations were similar in color to the original. Subsequently, the rest of the underground stations also began to replace wall tiles and hanging decorations accordingly, completing the remaining station renovations using designs as close to the original style as possible.
In June 2016, Guangzhou Metro began to study how to extend the service life of Line 1's A1 series, trains which date from the late 1990s. The A1 series was the rolling stock used during the opening of Line 1 and are the oldest in the Guangzhou Metro. The first A1 series trains started the refurbishment 2019–2020. The refurbished trains feature rebuilt interiors, lighting and electrical systems as well as LCD passenger information screens. The newer A3 series where also updated their dot-matrix route maps with full color LCD passenger information screens. In order to ensure the continuation of reliable daily operations, it was planned to upgrade the entire aging existing signaling system of Line 1. According to the tender information, it will be upgraded to a newer version of the Siemens signaling system. In February 2022, Guangzhou Metro decided to use the holidays in March and April to upgrade the catenary, signaling system and other equipment of Line 1. During the 16-day upgrade and renovation period, the two-way traffic of Line 1 will be closed 1.5 hours earlier.

History

Stations
 OSI - Out-of-station interchange (only available for IC cards users)

References

01
Railway lines opened in 1997
1997 establishments in China